Dietrich Knothe (6 January 1929 – 7 September 2000) was a German conductor and choral conductor, winner of the 1985 Handel Prize presented by the city of Halle.

Biography 
Knothe was born in Dresden. At the age of 10, he joined the Thomanerchor of the St. Thomas School, Leipzig under conductor Günther Ramin in 1939. After his studies at the music academies of Leipzig and Berlin-Charlottenburg, Knothe worked from 1953 with the MDR Rundfunkchor of Leipzig.

In 1955 he founded the "Capella Lipsiensis", an ensemble of soloists with whom he mainly performed music of the Renaissance and the Baroque eras.

For political reasons Knothe was dismissed without notice in 1962 when he and his choir gave up singing the National Anthem after a concert. Until he was appointed vice-director of the Berliner Singakademie in 1966, Knothe was a taxi driver and pianist in a ballet school. In 1975 he was promoted to director of the Berlin Singakademie. In 1979 he was awarded the Art Prize of the German Democratic Republic.

From 1982 until his retirement in 1993, Knothe was music conductor of the Rundfunkchor Berlin.

He died in Berlin.

References

External links 
 
 

German choral conductors
Recipients of the National Prize of East Germany
1929 births
2000 deaths
Musicians from Dresden
Handel Prize winners
German taxi drivers